Leonardo Foscolo (1588. - 1660.) was a Venetian commander.

During the Cretan War (1645–1669), Leonardo Foscolo seized several forts, retook Novigrad, temporarily captured the Knin Fortress, and managed to compel the garrison of Klis Fortress to surrender.

Footnotes

Bibliography
 
 
Federico Moro - Venezia e la guerra in Dalmazia (1644-1649) - Anno edizione: 2018 -

Republic of Venice people of the Ottoman–Venetian Wars
17th-century Italian military personnel